Ramaiyan, Ramayyan or Ramappaiyyan was a general who served under the Madurai Nayak king Thirumalai Nayak. He is the subject of the Tamil ballad Ramayyan Ammanai.

Personal life 

Ramaiyan was a Brahmin soldier who served in the army of Thirumalai Nayak.  He acquired fame for his prowess as a swordsman and gradually rose to become an important general in the Nayak's army.

War against Mysore 

Ramaiyan's first major battle was against Harasura Nandi Raja, the general of the Mysore kingdom. In 1633, Halasura invaded the Nayak kingdom and marched as far as Dindigul but was repulsed by Ramaiyan and Ranganna Nayak, the polygar of Kannivadi.

Ramaiyan also participated in the Nayak invasion of Travancore in 1634-35.

War against Ramnad 

In 1639, Tambi, an illegitimate brother of the Sethupathi Cadaikkan and a contender for the throne rebelled against the king. Thirumalai supported the rebel and sent a huge army under the leadership of Ramaiyan.

Ramaiyan fought the Ramnad troops led by the Sethupathi's son-in-law Vanni in the Maravar country. The war lasted five months and resulted in Nayak's victory. The Sethupathi, himself, fled to Pamban Island but was captured and taken prisoner.

Ramayyan Ammanai 

Ramaiyan's exploits in the 1639 war were the subject of a popular Tamil ballad, Ramayyan Ammanai.  In the ballad, Cadaikkan, initially, ridicules Ramaiyan

On completion of the war, Ramaiyan sends the following message to Thirumalai Nayak:

Death 

Ramaiyan died shortly after his victory against Ramnad. His death is believed to have taken place sometime between 1639 and 1648.

Notes

References 

 

Madurai Nayak dynasty
17th-century Indian people
17th-century deaths
Year of birth unknown